Stanislav Evgenievich Prokofiev (born 28 February 1968, Saratov, Soviet Union) is a Russian economist. 

In 2021, he became rector of Financial University under the Government of the Russian Federation.

International sanctions
Following the 2022 Russian invasion of Ukraine, the government of Ukraine has introduced sanctions against Prokofiev as well as against the Financial University, and its president Mikhail Eskindarov. In March that year, Prokofiev and Eskindarov had signed an open letter of Russian university rectors supporting the invasion.

The sanctions include an indefinite termination of any cultural exchange, scientific cooperation, educational and sports contacts, entertainment programs of Ukrainian entities and persons with the Financial University as well as a visa ban and asset freeze for Prokofiev and Eskindarov.

References

1968 births
Living people
Russian economists
Rectors of the Financial University under the Government of the Russian Federation
Scientists from Saratov
Sanctioned due to Russo-Ukrainian War